Lacrymaria olor is a species of ciliates, typically  long, that is found in freshwater ponds. Its name means "swan tear" in Latin, and refers to its general shape: namely, a teardrop-shaped cell with a small "head" at the end of a long slender "neck".  The protist is notable for its ability to extend the anterior end of the cell up to 7 times its body length, and manipulate in many directions — even around obstacles — in order to capture its food.  For that reason it is a popular subject for amateur microscopists. The classification has been attributed to Müller (1786).

The protist usually has two macronuclei and a single micronucleus. Its entire cell body is covered with cilia arranged in spirals. It has two contractile vacuoles, one at each end of the body. It contains small birefringent crystals.

Lacrymaria olor can be easily reproduced in vitro, but cultivated populations are difficult to maintain for long.  It can reproduce sexually, with each individual assuming either of two mating types ("sexes") at various times of the day. It can also reproduce asexually, possibly after an internal rearrangement of its genome; but there is evidence that this mechanism stops working after a certain number of consecutive asexual generations.  It can also regenerate a new head within minutes, if the original is cut off.

Lacrymaria feed primarily on smaller organisms such as other ciliates, flagellates, and amoeba, but may sometimes tear chunks out of larger ciliates.

Gallery

See also
 Dileptus anser

References

 Lacrymaria olor page at the Encyclopedia of Life. Accessed on 2009-12-04.

Species described in 1786
Litostomatea